Qairat Abdirazaquly Mami (قايرات ٵبدٸرازاقۇلى مٵمئ; born 9 May 1954) is a Kazakh jurist and politician, former Chairman of the Senate of Kazakhstan, former twice chairman of the Supreme Court of Kazakhstan, and a former chairman of the Constitutional Council of Kazakhstan.

Kairat Mami was born in 1954. He graduated from the Kazakh State University in 1981 specializing in law. Lawyer, Doctor of Law, Professor. 

Worked as Chairman of Guryev (currently Atyrau) Regional Court, Member of the Supreme Court of the Kazakh SSR, Chairman of Almaty Municipal Court, Chairman of the Panel of the Supreme Court, Vice Minister of Justice, Deputy Head of the Presidential Administration, Chairman of the Supreme Court, Prosecutor General of the Republic of Kazakhstan. 

In April 2011 by the Decree of the President was appointed as a Member of the Senate of the Parliament of the Republic of Kazakhstan. By the proposal of President was approved as Chairman of the Senate.
 
Awarded with Parasat, 2nd degree Barys orders and four medals.

References 

 Председатель Верховного суда Кайрат Мами назван самым компетентным политиком года

1954 births
Chairmen of the Senate of Kazakhstan
Living people
Kazakhstani jurists
People from Jambyl Region
Nur Otan politicians